The Royal Victorian Chain is a decoration instituted in 1902 by King Edward VII as a personal award of the monarch (i.e. not an award made on the advice of any Commonwealth realm government). It ranks above the Royal Victorian Order, with which it is often associated but not officially related. Originally reserved for members of the royal family, the chain is a distinct award conferred only upon the highest dignitaries, including foreign monarchs, heads of state, and high-ranking individuals such as the Archbishop of Canterbury.

History
The Royal Victorian Chain was created by Edward VII in 1902, six years after his mother created the Royal Victorian Order. The Royal Victorian Chain ranks above all decorations of the Royal Victorian Order, but it is not officially part of the Order. Edward created it to honour his mother "as a personal decoration for Sovereigns, Princes, and other Royal personages, and also for a few eminent British subjects." It was first recorded as a new decoration in August 1902, when it was reported that Frederick Temple, Archbishop of Canterbury, was received in private audience to receive the Royal Victorian Chain, following the coronation of the King two days earlier. The first recipients included the King's son, George, Prince of Wales (later George V), and the King's brother, Prince Arthur.

Design

The chain is in gold, decorated with motifs of Tudor rose, thistle, shamrock, and lotus flower (symbolizing England, Scotland, Ireland, and India, respectively) and a crowned, red enamelled cypher of King Edward VII—ERI (Edwardus Rex Imperator)—surrounded by a gold wreath for men, upon which the badge is suspended. The chain is worn around the collar by men or with the four motifs and some chain links fixed to a riband in the form of bow (blue with red-white-red edges) on the left shoulder by women. However, the Queen's sister, the late Princess Margaret, Countess of Snowdon, in later life chose to wear her chain around the collar, as male recipients do.

The badge is a gold, white enamelled Maltese Cross; the oval-shaped central medallion depicts Victoria's royal and imperial cypher—VRI (Victoria Regina Imperatrix)—on a red background, surrounded by a crown-surmounted blue ring bearing the word Victoria. Both the crown and Queen Victoria's cypher are studded with diamonds.

Eligibility and allocation
The Royal Victorian Chain does not confer upon its recipients any style, title or postnominal letters, nor does it give precedence within any Commonwealth honours system. However, it represents a personal token of high distinction and esteem from the monarch. The chain can be conferred upon men and women of any nationality.

It has normally served as the senior award for Canadians, who are generally ineligible to receive titular honours under federal Cabinet policy. Only two Canadians have thus far been conferred with the chain: Vincent Massey and Roland Michener, both former governors general.

The Royal Victorian Chain is invariably granted to holders of the office of Archbishop of Canterbury. 

The Royal Victorian Chain must be returned on the death of the recipient.

List of living recipients of the Royal Victorian Chain

See also
 List of recipients of the Royal Victorian Chain
 List of Canadian awards

References

External links

1902 establishments in the United Kingdom
Awards established in 1902